Chotcza  is a village in Lipsko County, Masovian Voivodeship, in east-central Poland. It is the seat of the gmina (administrative district) called Gmina Chotcza.

The village has a population of 170.

References

Chotcza